Lachanas is a village and a former municipality in the Thessaloniki regional unit, Greece. Since the 2011 local government reform it is part of the municipality Lagkadas, of which it is a municipal unit. The seat of the municipality was in Xylopoli. The municipal unit Lachanas has an area of 210.090 km2, and the community Lachanas has an area of 47.602 km2.

Population
The population of the municipal unit was 2,441 inhabitants in 2011 and that of the community was 568 inhabitants.

References

Populated places in Thessaloniki (regional unit)